The Turrbal are an Aboriginal Australian people from the region of Brisbane, Queensland. The name primarily refers to the dialect they speak, the tribe itself being alternatively called Mianjin/Meanjin. Mianjin is also the Turrbal word for the central Brisbane area. The traditional homelands of the Turrbal stretch from the North Pine River, south to the Logan River, and inland as far as Moggill, a range which includes the city of Brisbane.

Name
The ethnonym Turrbal is an exonym which is thought to derive from the root turr/dhur (bora ring) and -bal, signifying "those who say turr or dhur for a bora ring", rather than using the other tribe's customary term bool. It was the toponym used in 1841 by native guides from Nundah who led the group of German Lutheran missionaries to the Ningy Ningy at what became Toorbul Point, in the area where they established the Zion Hill Mission.

Language
Turrbal is one of 4 dialects of the Durubalic branch of the Pama-Nyungan languages. Turrbal was spoken from Gold Creek and Moggill, north as far as North Pine, and south to the Logan River. Tom Petrie, son of one of the founding families of the Brisbane area settlements, grew up among the Turrbal, and mastered the language and the contiguous dialects from an early age.

Country
The Turrbal mob itself was located specifically in what is now called the Brisbane CBD, the name for which was Mianjin. Neighbouring Aboriginal nations include the Gubbi Gubbi and Wakka Wakka to the north, the Dalla to the northwest and the Ngugi of Moreton Island. Despite collective title to a stretch of land, the Turrbal like many tribes permitted private ownership of specific sections of land, down to recognizing personal possession of parts of a river or even of trees and shrubs. Petrie describes the situation in the following words:
Though the land belonged to the whole tribe, the head men often spoke of it as theirs. The tribe in general owned the animals and birds on the ground, also roots and nests, but certain men and women owned different fruit or flower-trees and shrubs. For instance, a man could own a bonyi (Araucaria bidwilli) tree, and a woman a minti (Banksia amula), dulandella (Persoonia Sp.), midyim (Myrtus tenuifolia), or dakkabin (Xanthorrhoea aborea) tree. Then a man sometimes owned a portion of the river which was a good fishing spot, and no one else could fish there without his permission.

Mythology
In Turrbal thought, the origins of the division of the sexes was attributed to two distinct birds. Menfolk all came from the billing (a small house bat). Women in turn had their descent from a wamankan (night-hawk). Given their mythic function, they could not be eaten, but capturing and killing them was permitted.

History
The explorer John Oxley, on first sighting the Turrbal in 1824, called them "about the strongest and best-made muscular men I have seen in any country".

The Turrbal's tracks form the basis of many modern-day roads. Waterworks Road from Ashgrove is built on a Turrbal track that leads to Mount Coot-tha. Turrbal people would go to Mount Coot-tha to collect honey (ku-ta) from the bees there; it is the place of the honey-bee dreaming. Similarly, Old Northern Road from Everton Hills is built on a Turrbal track that led to the site of a triennial Bunya feast in neighboring Wakka Wakka country.

Many suburbs and places in Brisbane have names derived from Turrbal words. Woolloongabba is derived from either woolloon-capemm meaning "whirling water", or from woolloon-gabba meaning "fight talk place". Toowong is derived from tuwong, the onomatopoeic name for the Pacific koel. Bulimba means "place of the magpie-lark". Indooroopilly is derived from either nyindurupilli meaning "gully of leeches", or from yindurupilly meaning "gully of running water". Enoggera is a corruption of the words yauar-ngari meaning "song and dance".

Hunting and gathering economy
The Turrbal exploited a large range of local species of animals and insects as part of their daily cuisine. These may be divided into sea- and riverine food, mainland victuals, and vegetables.

Vegetables and fruit
 The Turrbal gathered the pencil yam (tarm) from scrub borders, where it was often found almost a metre underground.
 Shoots from the crowns of both (the cabbage-tree palm (binkar)) and the king palm (pikki) served as vegetables.
 Blechnum serrulatum, a swamp fern called bangwal was a delicacy found in abundance, and generally consumed as a bread-like sidedish with fish or meat. a freshwater rush called (yimbun) was also harvested and once prepared, tasted like arrowroot.
 The Moreton Bay chesnut (mai), a root called bundal in Turrbal but more widely known as cunjevoi, Canavalia Obtusifolia beans, (yugam) and zamia nuts, though poisonous, were rendered edible by long soaking after the nuts were cracked. They were then roasted. Mai was pounded into a cake, (as were yugam beans, and bundal) and the word was later used to denote European bread. The 1889 book The Useful Native Plants of Australia records that "The seeds are eaten ... after cooking, as they are poisonous in the raw state. Some shipwrecked sailors in Northwest Australia were poisoned by them."
 geebung (dulandella) was relished and eaten raw, as were two varieties of wild fig, called respectively ngoa-nga and nyuta. white myrtle berries (midyim), located on sandy islands, like the dubbul berry, were much sought after as a sweet. dogwood gum (denna) was also highly prized.
 The breadfruit (winnam) was chewed and sucked.

Meats
 A variety of snakes were eaten: the carpet snake (kabul); the black snake (tumgu); brown snake (kuralbang) and death-adder (mulunkun).
 Aside from lizards, two varieties of goanna were hunted, the larger one being called giwar, while the smaller variety was named barra. The echidna (kagarr), tortoises (binkin), turtle (bowaiya) also formed part of their diet.
 Two varieties of kangaroo and possum were hunted, the groman or old man kangaroo and the murri, and the forest possum (kupi) and scrub possum (kappolla). Koalas (dumbripi) were also highly prized.
 The large black flying squirrel (panko), the small grey squirrel (chibur), the Quoll (mibur) were eaten, as was the flying fox (gramman) while the dingo (mirri) was not part of their diet, the pups being taken in order to be domesticated. 
 Among the hunted avian species were the scrub turkey (wargun), the emu (ngurrun), the black swan (marutchi), native ducks (ngau'u), quail duwir, parrots (pillin) and cockatoos (kaiyar), the latter highly valued for the yellow topknots (billa billa) employed by men as a ceremonial adornment.

They often sought out goanna (magil) eggs, which could be found near ant nests in soft soil. The Turrbal would occasionally hunt marine animals, such as dugongs (yangon), porpoises (talobilla), tailor fish (punba), and mullet (andakal).

Alternative names
Turubul, Turrubul, Turrubal, Terabul, Torbul, Turibul 

Ngundari may have been a clan group of Turrbal people.

Notable people 
 Maroochy Barambah is one of the elders of the Turrbal people and is an acclaimed performing artist

Notes

Citations

Sources

Aboriginal peoples of Queensland
Brisbane